Murad Gayali is an Azerbaijani footballer who plays as a defender for Sabail in the Azerbaijan Premier League.

Club career
On 24 April 2017, Gayali made his debut in the Azerbaijan Premier League for Keşla match against Gabala.

Honours
Keşla
Azerbaijan Cup (1): 2017–18

References

External links
 

1999 births
Living people
Association football defenders
Azerbaijani footballers
Azerbaijan youth international footballers
Azerbaijan under-21 international footballers
Azerbaijan Premier League players
Shamakhi FK players
Sabail FK players